George Ridley (1818 – 4 November 1887) was a British Liberal and Whig politician.

The son of former Newcastle-upon-Tyne Whig MP Matthew Ridley and Laura née Hawkins, Ridley followed his father into politics, also as a Whig MP. After unsuccessfully contesting South Northumberland in 1852, he was elected for his father's former seat at a by-election in 1856—caused by the resignation of John Blackett due to ill health—and, becoming a Liberal in 1859, held the seat until 1860, when he resigned after being appointed a Copyhold, Inclosure and Tithe Commissioner.

References

External links
 

Whig (British political party) MPs for English constituencies
Liberal Party (UK) MPs for English constituencies
UK MPs 1852–1857
UK MPs 1857–1859
UK MPs 1859–1865
Younger sons of baronets
1818 births
1887 deaths